is a fictional character created by Yuichiro Ohno and produced by the Japanese company Quan, Inc. Featuring a salaryman with the head of a fish, the character has been featured in a web comic series by Quan, Inc., as well as being known for its stickers on Facebook and Line. A 3D motion-capture anime series aired on Tokyo MX from July 7 to August 11, 2019.

Background and creation

Business Fish was created by Yuichiro Ohno and published by Quan, Inc. Ohno posted several web comics with Quan, Inc. featuring Business Fish. A sticker sets featuring the character were released in 2015 on Facebook and Line. The Facebook sticker set was downloaded 250,000,000 times worldwide.

Characters

The original creation concept and web comic focused on Business Fish, a white-collared salaryman who often skips work but uses his abilities to help people in need. Other characters who appeared in the web comic include Craig, Business Fish's colleague; Chairman, Business Fish's best friend; Octopus CEO, the CEO of the company; Dog, Business Fish's pet dog; Manager, Business Fish's manager; Amuro, a colleague from the R&D section of the company; and Lady Fish, Business Fish's older sister.

Anime adaptation

Tai is a salaryman with the head of a fish, working at Sea Vision. He feels inadequate about his life.

Otohime is Tai's high school classmate who was popular when they were students. She and Tai begin dating.

Fudō is Tai's junior colleague, who Tai feels is irresponsible.

Hachio is Tai's colleague and confidant.

Ebika is Tai's colleague with the head of a shrimp.

Asase is the chief of Tai's department.

Mosugu is Tai's colleague.

Ika is a fashionable employee of a café with the head of a squid.

Media

Anime

In June 2019, Quan, Inc. announced that a joint partnership had been formed with Toho to create and distribute a 3D CG anime adaptation based on the original Business Fish character. The series began airing on Tokyo MX, BS11, and Hulu from July 7 to August 11, 2019. The series is directed by Takashi Sumida, who created the drama Kakū OL Nikki, with animation provided by IANDA. The voice cast features a variety of Japanese actors, television personalities, and voice actors, who were selected out of 100 applicants and provided the motion capture for their characters. The ending theme song is "Don't Stop Moving" by Sarah Kelly, and the animation featured in the ending sequence was motion captured by dance group Shit Kingz.

Episode list

Notes

References

External links
 
 Official anime television series website
 

2019 anime television series debuts
Toho Animation